St. John's University (SJU) was a Christian university in Shanghai. Founded in 1879 by American missionaries, it was one of the oldest and most prestigious universities in China, often regarded as the Harvard of China.

After the founding of the People's Republic of China, the Communist government closed the university in 1952. Most of its faculty members, students and library collections were transferred to East China Normal University. Its board of governors moved the university to Hong Kong, founding Chung Chi College, a part of the Chinese University of Hong Kong. Its former campus at Shanghai is now utilized by the East China University of Political Science and Law.

History

Foundation as St. John's College 

The university was founded in 1879 as "St. John's College" by William Jones Boone and Joseph Schereschewsky, Bishop of Shanghai, by combining two preexisting Anglican colleges in Shanghai. The architect for the college's original quadrangle of buildings was Newark, New Jersey architect William Halsey Wood. The first president was Yen Yun-ching (Chinese: 顏永京, 1838–98). During the early period of St. John's College, Lydia Mary Fay (1804–78), a missionary of the Protestant Episcopal China Mission (or the American Church Mission), helped to set up Duane Hall, a secondary school which later became part of St. John's College.

St. John's began with 39 students and taught mainly in Chinese. In 1891, it changed to teaching with English as the main language. The courses began to focus on science and natural philosophy.

St. John's University 

In 1905, St. John's College became St. John's University and became registered in Washington D.C. in the United States. It thus had the status of a domestic university and American graduates of St. John's could proceed directly to graduate schools in the United States. As a result, the university attracted some of the brightest and wealthiest students in Shanghai at the time. It was the first institution to grant bachelor's degrees in China, starting in 1907.

The university was located at 188 Jessfield Road (now Wanhangdu Lu), on a bend of the Suzhou Creek in Shanghai and was designed to incorporate Chinese and Western architectural elements.

In 1925, some academics and students left St. John's and formed the Kwang Hua University. In 1951, Kwang Hua was incorporated into East China Normal University.

Chinese Civil War and disestablishment 
The university survived World War II and the Chinese Civil War. However, in 1952 the Communist government adopted a policy of creating specialist universities in the Soviet style of the time. Under this policy, St John's was broken up. Most of its faculties were incorporated into the East China Normal University. The medical school was incorporated into Shanghai Second Medical College, which became the School of Medicine, Shanghai Jiao Tong University in 2005. The campus became the site of the East China University of Politics and Law.

After the Cultural Revolution in mainland China, the surviving personnel of the original St. John's University Medical School administration decided to recognize the students who were mandated to transfer and subsequently graduated from Shanghai Second Medical College with honorable St. John's University Medical School degree; the diploma was signed by their well respected original president of St. John's.

Notable alumni
See also :Category:St. John's University, Shanghai alumni

 Clement Chang (1929–2018), a Taiwanese academic and politician
 Chen Chi-lu (1923–2014), minister of the Council of Cultural Affairs of the Republic of China, 1981–1988
 Cheng Tien-hsi (1884–1970), author and jurist, last ambassador of the Republic of China to the United Kingdom
 Irene Chou (1924–2011), artist 
 Cheng Youshu (born 1924), diplomat and poet
 Raymond Chow (1927–2018), filmmaker
Shelley N. Chou (1924–2001), neurosurgeon, U.S. Navy; interim dean of Univ of Minnesota Medical School
 Chung Sze Yuen (1917–2018), Hong Kong politician
 Thomas Dao (1921–2009), physician who developed breast cancer treatment alternatives.
 Robert Fan (1893–1979), architect 
 Z. Y. Fu, or Fu Zaiyuan (1919–2011), Chinese-Japanese entrepreneur and philanthropist 
 Francis Hsu (1920–1973), former Catholic bishop of Hong Kong
 Rayson Huang CBE (1920–2015), chemist, vice-chancellor of University of Hong Kong
 Hu Peiquan (1920–2019), engineering mechanician and aerospace engineer.
 Wellington Koo (1888–1985), diplomat, former president of the Republic of China, foreign minister, former judge and vice-president of the International Court of Justice
 Kwan Sung-sing (1892–1960), architect, “father of track and field in Taiwan”
 Lin Yutang (1895–1976), writer
 Liu Hongsheng (1888–1956), industrialist, known as the "King of Matches"
 Liu Tonghua (1929–2018), pathologist, academician of the Chinese Academy of Engineering
 Liu Yichang (1918–2018), writer
 Lu Ping (1927–2015), Chinese politician in charge of the return to China of Hong Kong and Macau
 Ma Yuehan, or John Ma (1883–1966), founder of physical education in modern China
 Meng Xiancheng (1899–1967), educator, the first president of East China Normal University
 Ngan Shing-kwan (1900–2001), Hong Kong transport and property tycoon
 I. M. Pei (1917–2019), architect (attended the university high school)
 Qian Liren (born 1924), Chinese politician and diplomat
 Shi Jiuyong (born 1926), jurist, former president of the International Court of Justice
 Rong Yiren (1916–2005), "Red Capitalist" founder of CITIC Group and vice president of the People's Republic of China
 Jiang Shaoji (1919–1995), internist and gastroenterologist in China
 Jing Shuping (1918–2009, graduated 1939), businessman, founder of Minsheng Bank, China's first privately owned bank 
 T. V. Soong (1894–1971), politician and businessman, premier of the Republic of China, brother of the Soong sisters
 K. H. Ting (1915–2012), Anglican bishop and national leader of Protestants in the People's Republic of China
Tsai (Cai) Neng (1930–1996), psychiatrist of the Shanghai Mental Health Center and pioneer of Chinese psychopharmacology, geriatric psychiatry, and psychosomatic medicine
 Frank Tsao (1925–2019), shipping magnate, founder of IMC Group and Malaysia International Shipping Corporation
 Vivian Shun-wen Wu (1913–2008), businesswoman
 Yen Chia-kan (1905–1993), politician, former vice president and president of the Republic of China
 Chou Wen-chung (1923–2019), Chinese American composer of classical music 
 Zhou Youguang (1906–2017), linguist
 Wang Yongnian (1927–2012), literary translator
 Yu Hung-chun (1898–1960), or O. K. Yui, premier of the Republic of China
 Zhu Qizhen (1927–2014), deputy foreign minister, Chinese ambassador to the US, and chair of the Foreign Affairs Committee of the National Peoples Congress of China
 Zhang Boling (1876–1951), founder of Nankai University and the Nankai system of schools
 Zhang Changshou (1929–2020), archaeologist
 Chen Zhongyi (1923–2019), engineer, academic, and politician
 Alpha Chiang (born 1927), mathematical economist
Pauline Woo Tsui (1920–2018), Chinese American women's rights activist

Administration
Francis Lister Hawks Pott, president of St. John's College 1888 to 1896, president of St. John's University from 1896 to 1941
William Z.L. (SiLiang) Sung was the vice president of St. John's University under Francis Lister Hawks Pott and later the first Chinese-born acting president during WWII. He was accused of collaboration with the Japanese after the war, imprisoned, and later acquitted. He was helped lead the first two delegations from China to the 1932 and 1936 Olympics. He emigrated to the US and became a priest in the Episcopal church, working as a chaplin with the Diocese of California. Also an undergraduate alumni.
William Payne Roberts, instructor and acting president in the absence of Pott (needs verification)
David Z.T. Yin, rector of the university, was a distinguished Chinese scholar who had represented the YMCA in Shanghai at the turn of the century.

Institutions with names that commemorate SJU
To keep the school's traditions alive, SJU alumni (called Johanneans) have founded three academic institutions bearing the same name:
 in Tamsui District, Taiwan, St. John's University was established in 1967;
 In Vancouver, St. John's College at the University of British Columbia was established in 1997, and;
 In Shanghai, St. John's College at the East China Normal University will open its door in 2016.

See also 
 St. John's University (Taiwan)
 St. Mary's Hall, Shanghai

References

Citations

Further reading 
 Seeds From The West : St John's Medical School, Shanghai, 1880–1952. Chen, Kaiyi; Imprint Publications, Chicago, 2001.

External links
St John's University Alumni Association 

 
Educational institutions established in 1879
1952 disestablishments in China
Defunct universities and colleges in Shanghai
Anglican universities and colleges
Christian colleges in China
1879 establishments in China